utp_ is the fourth collaboration between Alva Noto and Ryuichi Sakamoto. Ensemble Modern is featured on the CD as well.

Reception

—Max Schaefer, The Squid's Ear

Track listing
 "Attack" – 7:24
 "Grains" – 6:24
 "Particle 1" – 6:40
 "Transition" – 3:31
 "Broken Line 1" – 6:32
 "Plateaux 1" – 8:07
 "Silence" – 6:51
 "Particle 2" – 7:00
 "Broken Line 2" – 6:29
 "Plateaux 2" – 12:59

Personnel
 Ryuichi Sakamoto – piano, electronics
 Alva Noto – electronics
 Aaron Baird – double bass
 Rainer Romer – percussion
 Rumi Ogawa – percussion
 Johannes Schwarz – bassoon, contrabassoon
 Eva Bocker – cello
 Michael M. Kasper – cello
 John Corbett – clarinet, bass clarinet
 Nina Jansen – clarinet, bass clarinet
 Detmar Wiesner – flute, piccolo
 Patrick Judt – viola
 Yuval Gotlibovich – viola

References

2008 albums
Alva Noto albums
Ryuichi Sakamoto albums
Collaborative albums
Articles with underscores in the title
Raster-Noton albums